Nebiyou Sundance Perry (born October 2, 1999) is an American-born Swedish professional soccer player who plays as a winger for Major League Soccer club Nashville SC.

Career statistics

References

1999 births
Living people
American soccer players
United States men's youth international soccer players
Swedish footballers
Sweden youth international footballers
American expatriate soccer players
Swedish expatriate footballers
Association football forwards
AIK Fotboll players
1. FC Köln II players
1. FC Köln players
Trelleborgs FF players
Östersunds FK players
Nashville SC players
Regionalliga players
Superettan players
Allsvenskan players
American expatriate soccer players in Germany
Swedish expatriate sportspeople in Germany
Soccer players from New York City